Pajala IF is a sports club in Pajala, Sweden, established in 1930 playing soccer. It later also adopted basketball, table tennis, soccer, floorball, ice hockey, skiing and volleyball.

The men's volleyball team played in the Swedish top division during the season of 2000–2001.

References

External links
 Official website 

1930 establishments in Sweden
Basketball teams in Sweden
Defunct ice hockey teams in Sweden
Football clubs in Norrbotten County
Ski clubs in Sweden
Sports clubs established in 1930
Sport in Norrbotten County
Swedish floorball teams
Swedish volleyball clubs
Table tennis clubs in Sweden